Kham Karabad-e Galleh Tavak (also Romanized as Kham Kārābād-e Galleh Tavak; also known as Kham Kārābād) is a village in Qaleh-ye Khvajeh Rural District, in the Central District of Andika County, Khuzestan Province, Iran. In the 2006 census, its recorded population was 202, including 39 families.

References 

Populated places in Andika County